Kulikovo is a rural locality (a village) in Nikolskoye Rural Settlement, Kaduysky District, Vologda Oblast, Russia. The population was 10 as of 2002.

Geography 
Kulikovo is located 33 km north of Kaduy (the district's administrative centre) by road. Mikhaylovskaya is the nearest rural locality.

References 

Rural localities in Kaduysky District